The flag of the Aromanians is an unofficial ethnic flag used by some of the Aromanians, an ethnic group from the Balkans. They are scattered in Albania, Bulgaria, Greece, North Macedonia, Romania and Serbia and their estimates range from 350,000 to 3 million people. There is no official Aromanian entity in any of these countries.

Description
The flag is a white field with a blue outline near the edges. In the center, there is a white circle outlined in blue and crossed by horizontal and diagonal blue bands. Aromanians from other countries also have their own versions of this flag. Furthermore, during the Paris Peace Conference of 1919 and 1920, the Aromanians used a horizontal flag composed of five stripes: red, yellow, pale blue, yellow and black.

In some cases and among some groups, the flag is considered "holy" and there are strict rules about its use in weddings. The flag is esteemed and rules are expected to be followed.

Variations
The following are some historical or traditional flags used by the Aromanians:

See also
 Flag of Romania
 Flag of Moldova

References

External links
 

Aromanians
Aromanians
Aromanian symbols